Lee Bae-Yong (born January 1, 1947) was the 13th president of Ewha Womans University, in central Seoul, South Korea. In 1969, Lee graduated from Ewha Womans University Department of History, and in 1971, received her master's degree in History from the university.  Lee majored in Korean History at Sogang University where she earned a doctorate in 1984. Since 1985, Lee has worked as a professor.

Major career
 2010 - President of Presidential Council on Nation Branding
 2009 - The 3rd Director of Gyeonggi-do Family & Women’s Research Institute
 2008 - Consultant of the 17th Presidential Advisory Board
 2006 - The 13th president of Ewha Womans University
 2006 - President of Choseon Dynasty Historical Society
 2005 - Deliberating council member of Seoul Cultural Assets Committee
 2004 - President of Korean Association of Women’s History
 2003 - National Institute of Korean History committee member
 1999 - Seoul History Compilation committee member

References

Living people
1947 births
Sogang University alumni
Ewha Womans University alumni
Academic staff of Ewha Womans University
South Korean historians
South Korean academic administrators
South Korean women academics
20th-century South Korean educators
21st-century South Korean educators
South Korean women historians
20th-century women educators
21st-century women educators
Presidents of universities and colleges in South Korea
Women heads of universities and colleges